Autopsy is a Greek word meaning 'seeing for yourself', and is usually employed in a medical sense, referring to the examination of a corpse in order to determine cause of death.

Autopsy may also refer to:

Arts, entertainment, and media

Films
 Autopsy (1975 film), Italian film
 Autopsy (2008 film), American horror film
The Autopsy of Jane Doe, a 2016 film

Music
 Autopsy (band), death metal band
 Autopsy (45 Grave album), 1987
 Autopsy (Rorschach album), 1995 
 The Autopsy, a 1994 album by American rapper C-Bo
 "Autopsy", a song by Fairport Convention from their 1969 album Unhalfbricking

Television
 "Autopsy" (House), 2005 episode of the American television series House
 Autopsy (TV series), American documentary television series
 “Autopsy”, an episode of The Good Doctor

Other uses
 Autopsy (software), open source computer forensics software tool

See also
Post-mortem (disambiguation)